Scandinavian Design, Inc. was a furniture retailer located in New York City. It was founded in 1955 by Hans Lindblom and his wife Celia, who sold the work of their friend, Swedish designer Bruno Mathsson, under the name Bruno Mathsson Furniture. During the years more and more designs were added, and the store became Scandinavian Design, Inc., representing many designers and manufacturers from Denmark, Finland and Sweden. Original designers that were at times showcased by Scandinavian Design included Alvar Aalto, Arne Jacobsen, Poul Kjaerholm, Borge Mogensen and Hans J. Wegner.

The showroom was first located at East 53 Street in Manhattan. It was later moved to East 59th Street, where it was located until 1998, then moved to 347 Fifth Avenue.

The company closed its showroom in 2014.

References

Furniture retailers of the United States
Retail companies established in 1955
1955 establishments in New York City
Retail companies disestablished in 2014
2014 disestablishments in New York (state)